Marcus S. Evans (born 1970) is a United States Army major general who has served as the Chief of Staff of the United States Special Operations Command since September 2021. Previously, he was the Commander of the NATO Special Operations Component Command–Afghanistan and Special Operations Joint Task Force–Afghanistan.

References

Living people
Place of birth missing (living people)
Recipients of the Defense Superior Service Medal
Recipients of the Legion of Merit
United States Army generals
United States Army personnel of the Iraq War
United States Army personnel of the War in Afghanistan (2001–2021)
1970 births